Ingende Airport  is an airstrip serving Ingende, a village on the Ruki River in Équateur Province, Democratic Republic of the Congo.

See also

 Transport in the Democratic Republic of the Congo
 List of airports in the Democratic Republic of the Congo

References

External links
 Ingende Airport
 HERE Maps - Ingende Airport
 OpenStreetMap - Ingende Airport
 OurAirports - Ingende Airport
 

Airports in the Province of Équateur